Arčelca (in older sources Arčevce) is a small settlement in the Municipality of Trebnje in eastern Slovenia. The area is part of the historical Lower Carniola region. The municipality is now included in the Southeast Slovenia Statistical Region.

Name
Arčelca was attested in historical sources as Ruczebitz and Rudczebicz in 1463, and Rutschewicz in 1467.

Church

The local church is dedicated to Mary Magdalene and belongs to the Parish of Sela pri Šumberku. It is a medieval building that was greatly remodelled in the Baroque style in the second half of the 17th century.

References

External links

Arčelca at Geopedia

Populated places in the Municipality of Trebnje